Françoise de Lansac née de Sainte-Maure de Montausier (1582-1657) was a French courtier. She was the royal governess of King Louis XIV of France and his brother from 1638 until 1643. 

She was the daughter of Gilles de Souvré and married to Artus de Saint Gelais in 1601. She was a relative of Cardinal Richelieu. In 1638, the king and Cardinal Richelieu reorganized the household of the queen and replaced everyone considered disloyal to the king and the cardinal with their own loyalists. 

Consequently, Françoise de Lansac was appointed Royal Governess, and Count de Brassac and his spouse Catherine de Brassac were appointed to the positions superintendent of the household of the queen and Première dame d'honneur, respectively, in order to keep the queen and her household under control. 

When Queen Anne became regent in 1643, she replaced her with Marie-Catherine de Senecey.

References 
 Kleinman, Ruth: Anne of Austria. Queen of France. . Ohio State University Press (1985)

1657 deaths
17th-century French people
1582 births
Governesses to the Children of France
Court of Louis XIII
16th-century French people 
16th-century French women  
17th-century French women